Narong Pipathanasai (born 7 October 1953) is a former Thai naval officer. He served as commander-in-chief of the Royal Thai Navy from 1 October 2013 to 30 September 2014. Kraison Chansuwanit was appointed as his successor. He then served as Minister of Education in the first cabinet of Prime Minister Prayut Chan-o-cha.

Biography 
Narong born on 7 October 1953, was the son of Lieutenant Commander Phithet and Manee Phipattanasai. He graduated from Armed Forces Academies Preparatory School and Royal Thai Naval Academy Class 70. He previously held an important position, including the Director of Education Naval Command and Staff College, then Naval Attache in Italy, Deputy General Staff of Naval Operations, Deputy Chief of Staff of the Navy, and deputy Commander-in-Chief of the Navy before becoming the Commander in Chief of the Royal Thai Navy in 2013 and served as Minister of Education in 2014 in the Government of Prayut Chan-o-cha. Later, he was adjusted to take the position of Deputy Prime Minister on 19 August 2015.

Narong being taken out of the cabinet on 23 November 2017.

National honours
:
 Knight Grand Cordon (Special Class) of the Most Exalted Order of the White Elephant 
 Knight Grand Cordon (Special Class) of the Most Noble Order of the Crown of Thailand
 Recipient of the Border Service Medal
 First Class of Boy Scout Citation Medal of Vajira

References 

Living people
1953 births
Narong Pipathanasai
Narong Pipathanasai
Narong Pipathanasai
Narong Pipathanasai
Narong Pipathanasai
Narong Pipathanasai
Narong Pipathanasai